is a subway station on the Toei Ōedo Line in Nakano, Tokyo, Japan, operated by the Tokyo subway operator Tokyo Metropolitan Bureau of Transportation (Toei).

Lines
The station is numbered "E-34".

Station layout
The station has one island platform on the second basement ("B2F") level, serving two tracks.

Platforms

History
The station opened on 19 December 1997.

Passenger statistics
In fiscal 2011, the station was used by an average of 22,697 passengers daily.

Surrounding area
 Egota-no-Mori Park
 Nihon University College of Art
 Musashi University
 Musashi Junior & Senior High School

See also
 List of railway stations in Japan

References

External links

  

Railway stations in Japan opened in 1997
Toei Ōedo Line
Stations of Tokyo Metropolitan Bureau of Transportation
Railway stations in Tokyo